Pyrenobotrys is a genus of fungi in the family Venturiaceae.

References

External links
Pyrenobotrys at Index Fungorum

Venturiaceae